Scrobipalpula hodgesi is a moth in the family Gelechiidae. It was described by Povolný in 1967. It is found in North America, where it has been recorded from Arizona.

References

Scrobipalpula
Moths described in 1967